Robin Hood of Monterey is a 1947 American adventure film directed by Christy Cabanne and starring Gilbert Roland, Chris-Pin Martin and Evelyn Brent. The film was part of the long-running Cisco Kid series produced by Monogram Pictures. The Cisco Kid travels to Monterey, California (then part of Mexico), where he clears the son of an old friend of a charge of murder.

Plot

Cast
 Gilbert Roland as The Cisco Kid  
 Chris-Pin Martin as Pancho  
 Evelyn Brent as Maria Belmonte Sanchez  
 Jack La Rue as Don Ricardo Gonzales  
 Pedro de Cordoba as Don Carlos Belmonte 
 Donna Martell as Lolita 
 Travis Kent as Eduardo Belmonte  
 Thornton Edwards as El Capitan  
 Nestor Paiva as The Alcalde  
 Ernie Adams as Pablo 
 Fred Cordova as Henchman  
 Ray Jones as Henchman 
 Bob McElroy as Rurale  
 Alex Montoya as Juan  
 George Navarro as Card player 
 Artie Ortego as Alcalde's carriage driver  
 Julian Rivero as Doctor Martinez  
 Felipe Turich as Jose - Sentry / Servant
 Bob Woodward as Pedro

References

Bibliography
 Baugh, Scott L. Latino American Cinema: An Encyclopedia of Movies, Stars, Concepts, and Trends. ABC-CLIO, 2012.

External links
 

1947 films
1947 Western (genre) films
1940s historical adventure films
American historical adventure films
Monogram Pictures films
Films set in California
Films set in Mexico
Films directed by Christy Cabanne
Films set in the 19th century
Adaptations of works by O. Henry
Cisco Kid
American black-and-white films
1940s English-language films
1940s American films